Nora Arnezeder (born 8 May 1989) is a French actress and singer. The recipient of a Lumières Award, she is an accomplished actress in the French film industry.

Early life
Arnezeder was born in Paris, France. Her father Wolfgang Arnezeder is Austrian and Catholic, whereas her mother Piera Schinasi is an Egyptian Jew and of Sephardic Jewish descent. While she was still in high school, she studied acting, dancing and singing at the renowned drama school Cours Florent.

Career

Arnezeder's first major role was in 2008 in Paris 36 (French: Faubourg 36) directed by Christophe Barratier, and for which Arnezeder won the Lumières Award as well as the Étoile d'Or award. In this film, Arnezeder also performed the song "Loin de Paname", that was nominated for the Best Original Song at the 82nd Academy Awards. 

In 2009, Arnezeder was the face of Guerlain's fragrance L'Idylle.

In 2012, Arnezeder appeared in the film Safe House, as the girlfriend of Ryan Reynolds' character. In the same year she appeared in the role of Celia in The Words, which was presented at the Sundance Film Festival. In the same year, Arnezeder also starred in the horror slasher film Maniac.

In 2013, she was the leading actress in the internationally praised period drama adventure film Angélique directed by Ariel Zeitoun.

She appeared as Chloe Tousignant, a French intelligence investigator, in the main cast of the first two seasons (2015–17) of the CBS series Zoo.

Arnezeder appeared in 6 episodes, between 2014 and 2018, of the series Mozart in the Jungle, playing the feisty, gifted, and rambunctious character of Anna Maria—the wife of the main character.

She played the main role of Evelyn Rey on the single season of the YouTube science fiction series Origin (2018).

In 2021, Arnezeder played Lilly "The Coyote" in Zack Snyder's Netflix film Army of the Dead. She was also cast in the Paramount+ miniseries The Offer.

She starred in the 2021 English-language German-Swiss science fiction thriller film Tides (The Colony), playing the lead role of Blake.

Personal life
She was in a relationship with English actor Orlando Bloom in 2014.

Filmography

References

External links

 
 

French film actresses
21st-century French actresses
Cours Florent alumni
Most Promising Actress Lumières Award winners
21st-century French singers
1989 births
Living people
French television actresses
French Sephardi Jews
Mizrahi Jews
French people of Austrian descent
French people of Egyptian-Jewish descent
French people of Italian-Jewish descent